Md. Hase Uddin Dewan is a Jatiya Party (Ershad) politician and the former Member of Parliament of Gazipur-3.

Career
Dewan was elected to parliament from Gazipur-3 as a Jatiya Party candidate in 1986.

References

Jatiya Party politicians
Living people
3rd Jatiya Sangsad members
Year of birth missing (living people)